The third USS Chesapeake (ID-3395) was a United States Navy salvage ship in commission from March to October 1919.

SS Chesapeake was built in 1900 as a commercial cargo ship at Wilmington, Delaware, by Harlan and Hollingsworth. The U.S. Navy's Third Naval District inspected her at New York City on 28 March 1918 for possible World War I service. The Navy purchased her on 31 August 1918, assigned her Identification Number (Id. No.) 3395, fitted her out at New York City as a salvage ship, and commissioned her as USS Chesapeake on 22 March 1919.

Chesapeake departed New York on 12 May 1919 bound for Brest, France, where she joined the First Salvage Division supporting U.S. Naval Forces Operating in European Waters, caring for the many ships engaged in supporting the Army of Occupation and other post-World War I American military activities in Europe. In August 1919 nshe joined the force clearing the North Sea of the North Sea Mine Barrage, the vast minefields laid during World War I, in an operation almost as intricate and dangerous as the original minelaying had been. Chesapeake ferried various minesweeping equipment and supplies from Brest and Liverpool, England, to Kirkwall in the Orkney Islands, where the minesweeping operations were based.

Chesapeake was decommissioned at Brest on 25 October 1919 and later sold there to a British salvage firm.

References

Department of the Navy: Naval Historical Center Online Library of Selected Images: U.S. Navy Ships: USS Chesapeake (ID # 3395), 1919–1919. Originally the Civilian Steamship Chesapeake (1900)

Ships built by Harlan and Hollingsworth
1900 ships
Rescue and salvage ships of the United States Navy
World War I auxiliary ships of the United States